Inger Lemvigh-Müller (28 October 1902 – 21 June 1994) was a Danish equestrian. She competed in two events at the 1956 Summer Olympics.

References

1902 births
1994 deaths
Danish female equestrians
Danish dressage riders
Olympic equestrians of Denmark
Equestrians at the 1956 Summer Olympics
Sportspeople from Copenhagen